The French National Sequencing Center (Genoscope) was created in 1996 in Évry, France. It has been involved in the sequencing of the human genome.

Details
The Genoscope is a member of the CEA, and employs around 130 people.

References

Research institutes in France
Biological research institutes